Worms of the Earth is a collection of fantasy short stories by Robert E. Howard.  It was first published in 1974 by Donald M. Grant, Publisher, Inc. in an edition of 2,500 copies.  The stories feature Howard's character Bran Mak Morn.

Contents
 Foreword
 "The Lost Race"
 "Men of the Shadows"
 "Kings of the Night"
 "A Song of the Race"
 "Worms of the Earth"
 "Fragment"
 "The Dark Man"

References

1974 short story collections
Short story collections by Robert E. Howard
Fantasy short story collections
Donald M. Grant, Publisher books